In ancient Roman religion, Ops or  Opis (Latin: "Plenty") was a fertility deity and earth goddess of Sabine origin. Her equivalent in Greek mythology was Rhea.

Iconography
In Ops' statues and coins, she is figured sitting down, as Chthonian deities normally are, and generally holds a scepter, or a corn spray and cornucopia. In Roman mythology the husband of Ops was Saturn. Ops is identified as Rhea in Greek mythology, whose husband was Cronus, the bountiful monarch of the golden age; Cronus was Rhea's brother.

Name
In Latin writings of the time, the singular nominative (Ops) is not attested; only the form Opis is used by classical authors. According to Festus (203:19), "Ops is said to be the wife of Saturn and the daughter of Caelus. By her they designated the earth, because the earth distributes all goods to the human genus".

The Latin word ops means "riches, goods, abundance, gifts, munificence, plenty". The word is also related to opus, which means "work", particularly in the sense of "working the earth, ploughing, sowing". This activity was deemed sacred, and was often attended by religious rites intended to obtain the good will of chthonic deities such as Ops and Consus. Ops is also related to the Sanskrit word ápnas ("goods, property").

Worship
According to Roman tradition, the cult of Opis was instituted by Titus Tatius, one of the Sabine kings of Rome. Opis soon became the matron of riches, abundance, and prosperity. Opis had a famous temple in the Capitolium. Originally, a festival took place in Opis' honor on August 10. Additionally, on December 19 (some say December 9), the Opalia was celebrated. On August 25, the Opiconsivia was held. Opiconsivia was another name used for Opis, indicating when the earth was sown. These festivals also included activities that were called Consualia, in honor of Consus, her consort.

Mythology and literature
Opis, when syncretized with Greek mythology, was not only the wife of Saturn, she was his sister and the daughter of Caelus (as Uranus) and Tellus. Her children were Jupiter, Neptune, Pluto, Juno, Ceres, and Vesta. Opis was accorded queenly status and was reputed to be an eminent goddess. Temples, priests, and sacrifices were granted her by public law.

When Saturn (as Cronus) learned of a prophecy that his children by Opis would overthrow him, he ate his children one by one as they were born. Opis could not just stand, so instead of giving Saturn their final child, Jupiter, she wrapped a rock in swaddling clothes, and fed the stone to Saturn instead of Jupiter. Opis then went on to raise Jupiter in secret, and then helped him free his siblings from their father's stomach.

She is remembered in De Mulieribus Claris, a collection of biographies of historical and mythological women by the Florentine author Giovanni Boccaccio, composed in 1361–1362. It is notable as the first collection devoted exclusively to biographies of women in Western literature.

References

Primary sources
Boccaccio, Giovanni. (1362) De mulieribus claris.
Livy Ab urbe condita libri  XXIX.10.4–11.8, 14.5–14
Lactantius, Divinae institutions I.13.2–4, 14.2–5

Secondary sources
Virginia Brown's translation of Giovanni Boccaccio's Famous Women, pp. 12–13; Harvard University Press 2001;

External links

Earth goddesses
Fertility goddesses
Roman goddesses
Rhea (mythology)
Food goddesses
Food deities